"She Don't Know" is a song recorded by Canadian country artist Jade Eagleson. The song was written by James Barker, Jonathan Singleton, and Travis Wood, while Wood produced the track with Todd Clark. It is the third single from his second album Honkytonk Revival.

Background
Eagleson stated that when he was finishing up Honkytonk Revival, he realized he hadn't included a love song on the album. He decided to include "She Don't Know", saying "the lyrics in it are what really hit me because my love language isn’t words," adding "I might clean the kitchen and I’ll think that’s romantic, in my mind. So, when I heard this, I just had to sing this one". He said that he can "relate to this song on a very human level".

Critical reception
Cal Gratton of CJVR FM said that "She Don't Know" is a song that "gives a voice to all the quiet, stoic lovers," noting Eagleson's "smooth vocals" that "clearly articulates the love he holds for his wife". Natalli Amato of The Boot referred to the song as a "heartfelt love song" that shows Eagleson is "on track to make his mark on mainstream country music". She stated that he "retains his originality" with a "stripped-down, classic country sound" that is also "reminiscent of Luke Combs". Kim Hughes of Parton and Pearl stated that the track "boasts clever wordplay" and "[frames] Eagleson’s booming, bracing baritone in tender sentiment". Nanci Dagg of Canadian Beats Media said that Eagleson "has pulled out all the stops for couples around the world to celebrate their love for one another" with the release of "She Don't Know".

Commercial performance
"She Don't Know" reached a peak of number one on the Billboard Canada Country chart for the week dated June 4, 2022. It marked Eagleson's third consecutive chart-topper, and fourth overall. This makes Eagleson the first male Canadian country artist to land three consecutive number ones off his second studio album, and only the second Canadian ever to achieve this feat after Shania Twain. The song also peaked at number 57 on the Canadian Hot 100 for the same week, surpassing Eagleson's previous career high mark set by "All Night to Figure It Out in 2021. It has been certified Gold by Music Canada.

Music video
The official music video for "She Don't Know" premiered on People.com on April 26, 2022. It features Eagleson, his wife Marina, and their son Levi. The video was directed by Ben Knechtel, and was shot entirely on iPhones. Eagleson also released a video of himself performing "She Don't Know" live from the farm he grew up on in Bailieboro, Ontario alongside guitarists Ben Miller and Chris Bray.

Charts

Certifications

References

2021 songs
2022 singles
Jade Eagleson songs
Songs written by James Barker (singer)
Songs written by Jonathan Singleton
Songs written by Travis Wood (songwriter)
Song recordings produced by Todd Clark